Donald Eugene Thorin, ASC (October 12, 1934 – February 9, 2016) was an American cinematographer.

Biography 
Thorin was born in Omaha, Nebraska. In 1957, he went to Hollywood and started working as mailroom at 20th Century Fox. Later he moved to camera department as camera loader, and started his cinematographer career from the 2nd camera assistant on The Young Lions.

He worked with Taylor Hackford (An Officer and a Gentleman, Against All Odds), Michael Ritchie (Wildcats, The Golden Child, The Couch Trip), Martin Brest (Midnight Run, Scent of a Woman), and Steve Oedekerk (Ace Ventura: When Nature Calls, Nothing to Lose).

He was also cinematographer on well-known films such as Sylvester Stallone's Lock Up and Tango & Cash, Whoopi Goldberg's Boys on the Side, Bette Midler's The First Wives Club, and Samuel L. Jackson's Shaft.

He was the father of cinematographer and TV drama director Donald E. Thorin Jr. (born 1957), and camera department Jeffrey Thorin (born 1961).

Filmography 
As cinematographer:

As camera operator

Other roles

References

External links 
 
 Donald Thorin – cinematographers.nl

1934 births
2016 deaths
American cinematographers
Artists from Omaha, Nebraska
Creighton University alumni